Life Is a Game (French: La vie est un jeu) is a 1951 French comedy film directed by Raymond Leboursier and starring Rellys,  Jacqueline Delubac and Jimmy Gaillard.

Cast
 Rellys as Meristo  
 Jacqueline Delubac as Evanella  
 Jimmy Gaillard as Jean Lassère  
 Félix Oudart as L'oncle Amédée  
 Jean Martinelli as Le directeur du journal  
 Gisèle François as La fille du directeur 
 Jacqueline Cantrelle 
 Louis de Funès as Un voleur  
 Jacques Dynam 
 Gisèle Gray 
 Jacques Meyran 
 Marcel Pérès
 Robert Vattier

References

Bibliography 
 Bertrand Dicale. Louis de Funès, grimaces et gloire. Grasset, 2009.

External links 
 

1951 comedy films
French comedy films
1951 films
1950s French-language films
Films directed by Raymond Leboursier
French black-and-white films
1950s French films